Strong Poison is a  1930 mystery novel by Dorothy L. Sayers, her fifth featuring Lord Peter Wimsey and the first in which Harriet Vane appears.

Plot
The novel opens with mystery author Harriet Vane on trial for the murder of her former lover, Phillip Boyes: a writer with strong views on atheism, anarchy, and free love. Publicly professing to disapprove of marriage, he had persuaded a reluctant Harriet to live with him, only to renounce his principles a year later and to propose. Harriet, outraged at being deceived, had broken off the relationship.

Following the separation, the former couple had met occasionally, and the evidence at trial pointed to Boyes suffering from repeated bouts of gastric illness at around the time that Harriet was buying poisons under assumed names, to demonstrate – so she said – a plot point of her novel then in progress.

Returning from a holiday in North Wales in better health, Boyes had dined with his cousin, the solicitor Norman Urquhart, before going to Harriet's flat to discuss reconciliation, where he had accepted a cup of coffee. That night he was taken fatally ill, apparently with gastritis. Foul play was eventually suspected, and a post-mortem revealed that Boyes had died from acute arsenic poisoning. Apart from Harriet's coffee and the evening meal with his cousin (in which every item had been shared by two or more people), the victim appeared to have taken nothing else that evening.

The trial results in a hung jury. As a unanimous verdict is required, the judge orders a re-trial. Lord Peter Wimsey visits Harriet in prison, declares his conviction of her innocence and promises to catch the real murderer. Wimsey also announces that he wishes to marry her, a suggestion that Harriet politely but firmly declines.

Working against time before the new trial, Wimsey first explores the possibility that Boyes killed himself. Wimsey's friend, Detective Inspector Charles Parker, disproves that theory. The rich great-aunt of the cousins Urquhart and Boyes, Rosanna Wrayburn, is old and senile, and according to Urquhart (who is acting as her family solicitor) when she dies most of her fortune will pass to him, with very little going to Boyes. Wimsey suspects that to be a lie, and sends his enquiry agent Miss Climpson to get hold of Rosanna's original will, which she does in a comic scene exposing the practices of fraudulent mediums. The will in fact names Boyes as principal beneficiary.

Wimsey plants a spy, Miss Joan Murchison, in Urquhart's office where she finds a hidden packet of arsenic. She also discovers that Urquhart had abused his position as Rosanna's solicitor, embezzled her investments, then lost the money on the stock market. Urquhart recognised that he would face inevitable exposure should Rosanna die and Boyes claim his inheritance. However, Boyes was unaware of the will's contents and Urquhart reasoned that if Boyes were to die first, nobody could challenge him as sole remaining beneficiary, and his fraud would not be revealed.

After perusing A.E. Housman's A Shropshire Lad (in which the poet likens the reading of serious poetry to King Mithridates' self-immunization against poisons) Wimsey suddenly understands what had happened: Urquhart had administered the arsenic in an omelette which Boyes himself had cooked. Although Boyes and Urquhart had shared the dish, the latter had been unaffected as he had carefully built up his own immunity beforehand by taking small doses of the poison over a long period. Wimsey tricks Urquhart into an admission before witnesses.

At Harriet's retrial, the prosecution presents no case and she is freed. Exhausted by her ordeal, she again rejects Wimsey's proposal of marriage. Wimsey persuades Parker to propose to his sister, Lady Mary, whom he has long admired. The Hon. Freddy Arbuthnot, Wimsey's friend and stock market contact, finds a long-delayed domestic bliss with Rachel Levy, the daughter of the murder victim in Whose Body?

Principal characters
Lord Peter Wimsey – protagonist, aristocrat and amateur detective
Harriet Vane – protagonist, author of detective fiction
Philip Boyes – Harriet's former lover, now deceased
Norman Urquhart – Solicitor and Boyes' cousin
Rosanna Wrayburn, or "Cremorna Garden" – great-aunt of Boyes and Urquhart, sometime stage performer, now senile and bedridden
Charles Parker – police detective, friend of Wimsey
Miss Katharine Climpson – enquiry agent employed by Wimsey
Miss Joan Murchison – enquiry agent, employee of Miss Climpson
Lady Mary Wimsey – Wimsey's younger sister, engaged to Parker
The Hon. Freddy Arbuthnot – Wimsey's friend and stock market contact
Marjorie Phelps – artist friend of Wimsey

Title
The novel's title appears in some variants of the Anglo-Scottish border ballad Lord Rendal whose title character was poisoned by his lover:
"What did you have for your breakfast, my own pretty boy?
What did you have for your breakfast, my comfort and joy?"
"A cup of strong poison; mother, make my bed soon,
There's a pain in my heart, and I mean to lie down."

Literary significance and criticism 
In their review of crime novels (1989 edition), the US writers Barzun and Taylor called the novel "highest among the masterpieces. It has the strongest possible element of suspense – curiosity and the feeling one shares with Wimsey for Harriet Vane. The clues, the enigma, the free-love question, and the order of telling could not be improved upon. As for the somber opening, with the judge's comments on how to make an omelet, it is sheer genius."

The effect of arsenic as described in the novel was accepted by the science of the time, but it is now believed that long-term consumption would in fact have caused many health problems.

Adaptations
The novel was adapted for a BBC television series in 1987 starring Edward Petherbridge as Lord Peter and Harriet Walter as Harriet Vane.

It has been adapted for radio three times:

Background
While Sayers was working on her first novel, Whose Body?, she began a relationship with John Cournos, a writer of Russian-Jewish background.  Cournos was an advocate of free love: he did not believe in marriage and did not want children.  Cournos pressed Sayers to have sex with contraception, but she, a High Anglican, resisted to avoid what she called "the taint of the rubber shop". Their relationship foundered on the mismatch of expectations,  and within two years Cournos – apparently not believing in the ideas he had professed – had married somebody else. Both Sayers and Cournos later wrote fictionalised versions of their relationship: Sayers in Strong Poison (1930) and Cournos in The Devil is an English Gentleman (1932).

References

External links
 

1930 British novels
Novels by Dorothy L. Sayers
Novels about writers
Novels adapted into radio programs
British novels adapted into television shows
British mystery novels
Novels set in the 1920s
Novels set in London
Victor Gollancz Ltd books